Komar may refer to:

Places
 Komar, Iran (disambiguation), places in Iran
 Komar, mountain in central Bosnia, near Travnik
 Komar, Donji Vakuf, village in central Bosnia, between Travnik and Donji Vakuf
 Komar, Travnik, village in central Bosnia
Komar, Altai Krai, Russia
 Komar, village in Donetsk Oblast of Ukraine

Other
 Komar (surname)
 Komar class missile boat of the USSR
 RPG-76 Komar, a Polish anti-tank grenade launcher
 IS-B Komar, a Polish glider
 Komar mass
 Komar superpotential

See also
 
 Komarr, a science fiction novel by Lois McMaster Bujold